Matrona is a genus of damselflies in the family Calopterygidae.

Species include:
 Matrona basilaris
 Matrona corephaea
 Matrona cyanoptera
 Matrona kricheldorffi
 Matrona nigripectus
 Matrona oberthueri
 Matrona oreades
 Matrona taoi

References

External links

Matrona at the Encyclopedia of Life

Calopterygidae
Zygoptera genera
Taxa named by Edmond de Sélys Longchamps